Father to Be is a 1979 Swedish comedy-drama film directed by Lasse Hallström.

Plot
Bosse (Magnus Härenstam) is a young ad man, fascinated with cinema, with secret dreams of being an author. He meets Lena (Anki Lidén) at a diner, and after a period of dating, she becomes pregnant. Bosse tries to deal with the situation through an imaginary friend (Micha Gabay), an English-speaking American inspired by various tough guys from American genre films, with a knack for impulsive action but little respect for or understanding of fatherhood.

Cast
Magnus Härenstam as Bosse - De unga älskande 
Anki Lidén as Lena - De unga älskande 
Micha Gabay as Den avskyvärde kompisen 
Lis Nilheim as Sekreterare 
Gösta Engström as Kalle 
Ulf Brunnberg as Björn 
Lars Amble as Åke, reklambyråchef 
Lars Göran Carlsson as Reklamman 
Barbro Hiort af Ornäs as Greta, sjuksyster 
Stig Ossian Ericson as Reklamfilmsregissör 
Gunilla Thunberg as Expedit i bokhandel 
Lillemor Ohlsson as Reklamfilmstjej 
Mats Arehn as Reklamfilmskund 
Lars Lennartsson as Äldre herre på restaurang 
Torbjörn Ehrnvall as Reklamman 
Hans Harnesk as Kille i Victoria-kön 
Jan Halldoff as Kändis som går före i Victoria-kön 
Kerstin Bagge as Tjej i Victoria-kön 
Rune Söderqvist as Reklamman 
Billy Gustavsson as Reklamman 
Tomas Löfdahl as Reklamman 
Arne Andersson as Reklamman

References

External links
 
 

1979 films
Swedish comedy-drama films
1970s Swedish-language films
Films directed by Lasse Hallström
1970s Swedish films